This article covers the squad and match results for Newcastle United's 1999–2000 season.

During the season, English football club Newcastle United competed in the FA Premier League (known as the FA Carling Premiership for sponsorship reasons), finishing in 11th place. The season is notable for the resignation of Ruud Gullit early in the season, with Bobby Robson replacing him as manager.

Season summary
Four defeats from Newcastle's first five Premiership fixtures prompted the resignation of manager Ruud Gullit after one year in charge. He had fallen out with Alan Shearer and dropped the striker, who was absent in an embarrassing 2–1 loss to arch-rivals Sunderland.

Veteran ex-England manager and self-confessed Newcastle fan, Bobby Robson was brought in to replace Gullit - making Robson, at 66, the oldest manager in the league. His first home game in charge was particularly memorable and impressive: an 8–0 victory over Sheffield Wednesday, which remains the club's record Premier League home win. Striker Alan Shearer scored five of the goals in that game.

Robson ensured Newcastle's survival in the Premiership. This was achieved with stylish attacking football and with Lee and Shearer back onside. Robson consolidated a fading Newcastle side, and they finished a secure 11th in the final table. More impressively, they were the division's third-highest scoring team with 63 goals from 38 games.

Image gallery

Players

First-team squad

Left club during season

Reserve squad

Trialists

Transfers

In

First team

Reserves and academy

Out

First team

Reserves and academy

Loan in

First team

Reserves and academy

Loan out

First team

Reserves and academy

Statistics

Appearances, goals and cards
Last updated on 13 November 2010.
(Starts + substitute appearances)

(A player sent off for 2 bookable offenses has been counted as 2 yellows and 1 red in the above table)

(3 own goals)

Coaching staff

Top scorers
Based on above table.
Last updated on 13 November 2010.

Matches

Pre-season

Premier League

Results summary

Results by round

UEFA Cup

FA Cup

League Cup

References

External links
FootballSquads - Newcastle United - 1999/00

Newcastle United F.C. seasons
Newcastle United